Sans Souci is a village located on the right bank of the Lower Tugela river, in  KwaZulu-Natal, South Africa. The name is originally French and means without worries; it shares this name with the nearby farm of Sans Souci. Not much is known about its history, however a school existed as far back as 1893.

Notable residents 
Allison George Champion, member of the ANC, he was born in Sans Souci in 1893.

References 

Populated places in the KwaDukuza Local Municipality